The 2007 European Weightlifting Championships were held in Strasbourg, France from 17 April to 22 April 2007. It was the 86th edition of the event, which was first staged in 1896.

Medal overview

Men

Women

Medal table

Notes

References
Results of the 2007 European Weightlifting Championships 

E
European Weightlifting Championships
European Weightlifting Championships
International weightlifting competitions hosted by France
European Weightlifting Championships